Governor Branch may refer to:

Emmett Forest Branch (1874–1932), 31st Governor of Indiana
John Branch (1782–1863), Territorial Governor of Florida